Lifestyle Home (stylised as Lifestyle HOME) is an Australian subscription television channel dedicated to home and property programming. It ranges from home improvements to home investments, renovation, gardens and property.

Programming

Original programming
 Shaynna's World of Design (2015)
 Tiny House Australia (2016–present)
 I Own Australia's Best Home (2016–present)
 Deadline Design (2016–present)

Acquired programming
 A Place in the Sun
 Homes Under the Hammer
 Holmes On Homes
 Carter Can
 The Outdoor Room with Jamie Durie
 Mark Burnett's Design Star
 May the Best House Win
 House Gift
 My Dream Home
 Colin & Justin's Home Heist
 Property Virgins
 Axe The Agent

See also 
 Lifestyle
 Lifestyle You
 Lifestyle Food

References

External links
 
 XYZ Network

Television networks in Australia
English-language television stations in Australia
Television channels and stations established in 2011
2011 establishments in Australia
Foxtel